Vimartin-sur-Orthe is a new commune in the Mayenne department in north-western France. 
It was established on 1 January 2021 from the amalgamation of the communes of Vimarcé, Saint-Pierre-sur-Orthe and Saint-Martin-de-Connée

See also
Communes of the Mayenne department
List of new French communes created in 2021

References

Communes of Mayenne
2021 establishments in France
States and territories established in 2021